John Taylor Gatto (December 15, 1935 – October 25, 2018) was an American author and school teacher. After teaching for nearly 30 years he authored several books on modern education, criticizing its ideology, history, and consequences. He is best known for his books Dumbing Us Down: the Hidden Curriculum of Compulsory Schooling, and The Underground History of American Education: A Schoolteacher’s Intimate Investigation Into the Problem of Modern Schooling.

Biography
Gatto was born to Andrew Michael Mario and Frances Virginia ( Zimmer) Gatto in Monongahela, Pennsylvania, a steel town near Pittsburgh. In his youth he attended public schools throughout the Pittsburgh Metro Area including Swissvale, Monongahela, and Uniontown as well as a Catholic boarding school in Latrobe. He did undergraduate work at Cornell, the University of Pittsburgh, and Columbia, then served in the U.S. Army medical corps at Fort Knox, Kentucky, and Fort Sam Houston, Texas. Following army service he did graduate work at the City University of New York, Hunter College, Yeshiva University, the University of California, Berkeley, and Cornell.

By the late 1950s he worked as a copywriter scripting commercials in New York City. In the spring of 1960, he borrowed his roommate's teaching license, went into Harlem to work as a substitute teacher. Gatto earned his teaching certificate in the summer of 1960. In 1963, he was hired as a fulltime 8th grade English teacher at Intermediate School 44 on New York City's Upper West Side. Gatto moved on to Lincoln Academy (now Horizons Middle School) in 1981, which was considered a dumping ground for kids with behavior problems. Eventually Gatto found a position teaching predominantly poor, at-risk kids 8th grade students at Booker T. Washington Junior High in Spanish Harlem.

Gatto also ran for the New York State Senate, 29th District in 1985 and 1988 as a member of the Conservative Party of New York against incumbent David Paterson. He was named New York City Teacher of the Year in 1989, 1990, and 1991 and New York State Teacher of the Year in 1991. In 1991, he wrote a letter announcing his retirement, titled I Quit, I Think, to the op-ed pages of the Wall Street Journal, saying that he no longer wished to "hurt kids to make a living." He then began a public speaking and writing career, and has received awards from libertarian organizations, including the Alexis de Tocqueville 1997 Award for Excellence in Advancement of Educational Freedom.

Gatto promoted homeschooling, and specifically unschooling and open source learning. Wade A. Carpenter, associate professor of education at Berry College, has called his books "scathing" and "one-sided and hyperbolic, [but] not inaccurate" and describes himself as in agreement with Gatto. Ron Paul strongly endorsed Gatto's work, calling him a "legendary teacher" who helped shape his own thinking and homeschooling curriculum.  

Gatto was featured in the 2011 documentary film, IndoctriNation: Public Schools and the Decline of Christianity in America.

In 2011, Gatto had two major strokes which occurred after he completed the filming of The Ultimate History Lesson: A Weekend with John Taylor Gatto which was released in early 2012 by Tragedy and Hope Communications.

Personal life
Gatto was married to Janet (Gatto) with whom he spent half the year in New York City and the other half of the year at their farmhouse in upstate New York.

Main thesis

Gatto asserts the following regarding what school does to children in Dumbing Us Down:

 It confuses the students. It presents an incoherent ensemble of information that the child needs to memorize to stay in school. Apart from the tests and trials, this programming is similar to the television; it fills almost all the "free" time of children. One sees and hears something, only to forget it again.
 It teaches them to accept their class affiliation.
 It makes them indifferent.
 It makes them emotionally dependent.
 It makes them intellectually dependent.
 It teaches them a kind of self-confidence that requires constant confirmation by experts (provisional self-esteem).
 It makes it clear to them that they cannot hide, because they are always supervised.

He also draws a contrast between communities and "networks", with the former being healthy, and schools being examples of the latter. He says networks have become an unhealthy substitute for community in the United States.

Gatto's book aimed to inspire education advocates and the inception of Praxis tests. This testing measured academic competence and knowledge of specific subjects required for teaching. Praxis tests are taken by potential educators as part of certification required by state and professional licensing entities.

Gatto demystifies the apparent confusion and meaninglessness of public schooling system by exposing its real purpose and function. According to Gatto, the purpose of public education can be boiled down the six functions described by Alexander Inglis in his 1918 book Principles of Secondary Education:

 The adjustive or adaptive function. Schools are designed to establish fixed habits of response to authority.
 The integrating function. The purpose of this function is to make kids as alike as possible.
 The diagnostic and directive function. Schools determine each student's proper social role.
 The differentiating function. Students are trained no more than to meet the standards of determined social role.
 The selective function. Unadopted students are treated like inferiors in order to prevent their reproduction.
 The propaedeutic function. Small fraction of selected students is created in order to continue the schooling system.

After learning he was regularly confused with another teacher named John Gatto, he added Taylor to his pen name.

Selected bibliography

Articles and essays
 "Against School." Harper’s Magazine (September 2003), pp. 33–38. "How public education cripples our kids, and why."

Books
 Ken Kesey's One Flew Over the Cuckoo's Nest: A Critical Commentary. New York: Monarch Press (1975). . .
 Dumbing Us Down: The Hidden Curriculum of Compulsory Schooling. Philadelphia: New Society Publishers (1992). Foreword by Thomas Moore. . .
 The Exhausted School: The First National Grassroots Speakout on the Right to School Choice: Carnegie Hall, New York City. New York: Oxford Village Press (1993). Preface by Patrick Farenga. . .
 A Different Kind of Teacher: Solving the Crisis of American Schooling. Berkeley, Calif.: Berkeley Hills Books (2002). . .
 The Underground History of American Education. New York: Oxford Village Press (2001). . .
 Revised edition (2017) by Oxford Scholars Press (New York) features a foreword is by U.S. Congressman Ron Paul, an introduction by David Ruenzel, and an afterword by Richard Grove of Tragedy and Hope Media.
 Weapons of Mass Instruction: A Schoolteacher's Journey Through the Dark World of Compulsory Schooling. Gabriola Island, B.C. (Canada): New Society Publishers (2008). . .
 The Adventures of Snider, the CIA Spider. Lost Tools Press (2017). Illustrated by Anne Yvonne Gilbert. .

Filmography

Documentaries
 Human Resources (2010)
 IndoctriNation: Public Schools and the Decline of Christianity (2011)
 Thrive: What on Earth Will It Take? (2011)
 The Ultimate History Lesson: A Weekend with John Taylor Gatto (2012)
 Sourced transcript.
 Bibliography and references.

See also
 Critical pedagogy
 Deschooling Society (book by Ivan Illich)
 Hidden curriculum
 How Children Fail (book by John Holt)
 Total institution
Other critics of public education:
 Zachariah Montgomery
 Richard Grant White
 Charlotte Thomson Iserbyt

References

External links

 
 The Underground History of American Education at Internet Archive
 Dumbing Us Down at Internet Archive
 "The Six-Lesson Schoolteacher" – originally published in Whole Earth Review, Fall 1991
 The Seven Lesson School Teacher
 "Why Schools Don't Educate - Teacher of the Year acceptance speech"
 I Quit, I Think letter
 Appearances on C-SPAN
 John Taylor Gatto at IMDb
 Works by or about John Taylor Gatto in libraries (WorldCat catalog)

1935 births
2018 deaths
American education writers
Schoolteachers from New York (state)
American educational theorists
Education reform
Homeschooling advocates
Advocates of unschooling and homeschooling
Cornell University alumni
University of California, Berkeley alumni
Columbia University alumni
University of Pittsburgh alumni
Hunter College alumni
Yeshiva University alumni
People from Monongahela, Pennsylvania
Military personnel from Pennsylvania
Conservative Party of New York State politicians
American libertarians